12 Farvardin Square is a square in southern Shiraz, Iran where Jannat Street (Shishegari) and Artesh Boulevard meet each other. It goes to Fahmideh Square from the west and to Rahmat Highway from the south.

Transportation

Streets
 Artesh Boulevard
 Jannat Street (Shishegari)

Buses
 Route 3
 Route 26
 Route 33
 Route 135

Streets in Shiraz